Blue Moon Rendering Tools, or BMRT, was one of the most famous RenderMan-compliant photorealistic rendering systems and was a precursor to NVIDIA's Gelato renderer. It was distributed as freeware. BMRT was a popular renderer with students and other people who were trying to learn the RenderMan interface. It also had some features PhotoRealistic RenderMan did not have at the time, for example, ray tracing, radiosity, volume rendering, and area lights. Even Pixar used BMRT for ray tracing before PRMan had such features. According to Exluna, it was used for 3D rendering in movies such as A Bug's Life, Stuart Little, The Cell, Hollow Man, and Woman on Top.

BMRT was originally developed by Larry Gritz while he was at Cornell University.
He developed it during the early 1990s, first published it in 1994, and was subsequently hired by Pixar to work on their PhotoRealistic RenderMan product.

The last version of the renderer under the BMRT name was 2.6, released in November 2000. The first version of Entropy, BMRT's successor, was 3.0, released in July 2001. 

In 2000, Gritz left Pixar to form a company called Exluna, whose flagship product was Entropy, a RenderMan renderer based on BMRT with additional features and optimizations. NVIDIA acquired Exluna and Entropy in early 2002. Amid the acquisition, Pixar sued Gritz and Exluna (now NVIDIA) for a variety of patent, trade secret, and copyright issues that were categorically denied by Exluna. The case eventually settled, leading to the discontinuation of BMRT and Entropy. Gritz and other Exluna employees stayed at NVIDIA to develop the Gelato renderer.

Gallery

References

External links 
 The Demise of BMRT & entropy, from the RenderMan Repository 
 BMRT website, archived version through The Internet Archive

Rendering systems
3D rendering software for Linux
Proprietary commercial software for Linux
Freeware 3D graphics software
Global illumination software